Kraśnik  is a village in the administrative district of Gmina Połaniec, within Staszów County, Świętokrzyskie Voivodeship, in south-central Poland.

The village has a population of  61.

Demography 
According to the 2002 Poland census, there were 56 people residing in Kraśnik village, of whom 55.4% were male and 44.6% were female. In the village, the population was spread out, with 21.4% under the age of 18, 37.5% from 18 to 44, 12.5% from 45 to 64, and 28.6% who were 65 years of age or older.
 Figure 1. Population pyramid of village in 2002 – by age group and sex

References

Villages in Staszów County